Like Mom, Like Me is a 1978 American made-for-television drama film directed by Michael Pressman. The film was based on the novel of the same name written by Sheila Schwartz.

Plot
Althea is the mother of teenager Jennifer. Althea's husband leaves her; this has a horrible influence on her relationship with her daughter. When Althea starts to date other men, Jennifer can't accept this. Meanwhile, Althea is irritated by Jennifer taking over her own habits.

Cast
Linda Lavin - Althea Gruen
Kristy McNichol - Jennifer Gruen
Max Gail - Henry Millen
Stacey Nelkin - Tao Wolf
Michael LeClair - Peter
Lawrence Pressman - Michael Gruen
Patrick O'Neal - Philip Stanford
Michele Laurita - Mellissa

External links

1978 television films
1978 films
1970s English-language films
CBS network films
Films directed by Michael Pressman
Films scored by Lee Holdridge
Films based on American novels
1978 drama films
Films about mother–daughter relationships